The Women's 50m Freestyle event at the 11th FINA World Aquatics Championships was swum 30 – 31 July 2005 in Montreal, Quebec, Canada. Preliminary heats and Semifinal heats were 30 July; the final was 31 July.

At the start of the event, the existing World (WR) and Championships (CR) records were:
WR: 24.13, Inge de Bruijn (Netherlands) swum 22 September 2000 in Sydney, Australia
CR: 24.45, Inge de Bruijn (Netherlands) swum 28 July 2001 in Fukuoka, Japan

Results

Final

Semifinals

Preliminaries

References
Women's 50m Freestyle results (Prelims), from the 2005 FINA World Championships. Published by OmegaTiming.com (official timer of the 2005 Worlds); Retrieved 2010-02-07.
Women's 50m Freestyle results (Semifinals), from the 2005 FINA World Championships. Published by OmegaTiming.com (official timer of the 2005 Worlds); Retrieved 2010-02-07.
Women's 50m Freestyle results (Finals), from the 2005 FINA World Championships. Published by OmegaTiming.com (official timer of the 2005 Worlds); Retrieved 2010-02-07.

Swimming at the 2005 World Aquatics Championships
2005 in women's swimming